Justin Benn (born 15 May 1993) is a South African professional rugby union player who most recently played with . His regular position is flanker or number eight.

Career

Youth and Varsity Cup rugby

Benn received his first provincial call-up at primary school level, when he represented Eastern Province at the 2006 Under-13 Craven Week tournament held in Oudtshoorn.

Benn progressed to Under-21 level in 2013 and represented  nine times during the 2013 Under-21 Provincial Championship. He made five appearances off the bench (scoring a try in their match against  in a 53–26 victory) before being promoted to the starting line-up. He featured in their 44–41 extra time victory over the Golden Lions in the semi-final, but didn't feature in the final, which Western Province won, beating  30–23 in Cape Town.

At the start of 2014, Benn was included in the  squad that played in the 2014 Varsity Cup. He played in five round-robin matches and in the semi-final, which Maties lost 8–20 to Cape Town rivals .

Benn once again represented Maties in the Varsity Cup in 2015; he appeared in all seven of their matches during the competition as Maties finished in fifth place to miss out on the semi-finals for only the second time.

Western Province

After the 2015 Varsity Cup, Benn linked up with the  squad for the 2015 Vodacom Cup competition. Benn not only scored his first senior try in this match, but also added a second try in a 47–22 victory for Western Province.

References

South African rugby union players
Living people
1993 births
People from Uitenhage
Rugby union flankers
Rugby union number eights
Western Province (rugby union) players
Rugby union players from the Eastern Cape